Limba noastră,) is a public holiday in Moldova celebrated yearly on 31 August.

The holiday used to be known as Limba noastră cea română ("Our Romanian Language") or Ziua limbii române ("Romanian Language Day"), but its name was changed to the current one in 1994.

Overview
 
On 27 August 1989, the Popular Front of Moldova organized a mass demonstration in Chișinău, that became known as the Great National Assembly, which pressured the authorities of the Moldavian Soviet Socialist Republic (Moldavian SSR) to adopt a language law on 31 August 1989 that proclaimed the Moldovan language written in the Latin script to be the state language of the MSSR. Its identity and relationship with the Romanian language was also established. On June 23, 1990 the Moldovan Parliament established August 31 as a national language day.

Today, in the main square of Chișinău a concert is organized featuring the performances of various national entertainers. Normally the stage is not dismantled since Independence Day which takes place on 27 August.

See also 
 Popular Front of Moldova
 Limba noastră, the Moldovan national anthem
 Romanian Language Day

References 

Remembrance days
Language observances
August observances
1989 in the Moldavian Soviet Socialist Republic
Politics of Moldova
Public holidays in Moldova
Recurring events established in 1989
Festivals established in 1989
Summer events in Moldova